Cynisca ivoirensis is a worm lizard species in the family Amphisbaenidae. It is endemic to Ivory Coast.

References

Cynisca (lizard)
Reptiles described in 2014
Taxa named by Jean-François Trape
Taxa named by Youssouph Mané
Endemic fauna of Ivory Coast